McHale is an Irish firm manufacturing a range of farm machinery. McHale is located in the West of Ireland in the town of Ballinrobe, which is approximately 40 km North of Galway City.

References

External links

Machine manufacturers
Manufacturing companies established in 1970
Manufacturing companies of the Republic of Ireland
County Mayo
Articles containing video clips
Irish companies established in 1970